Younis Abdallah Rabee (born 15 October 1948) is a Kuwaiti former sprinter. He competed in the men's 100 metres at the 1972 Summer Olympics, and he was also the flag bearer for Kuwait at the 1972 Olympics.

References

External links
 

1948 births
Living people
Athletes (track and field) at the 1972 Summer Olympics
Kuwaiti male sprinters
Olympic athletes of Kuwait
Place of birth missing (living people)